The Bert Sutcliffe Oval is a cricket ground at Lincoln University in Lincoln, New Zealand that has staged first-class matches as well as international matches for both women's and under-19 level cricket. Previously known as BIL Oval, in February 2000 the ground was renamed in honour of the New Zealand opening batsman.

The ground staged its maiden first-class match in November 1999 when England A played the North Island in the Shell Conference. It has since staged a number of A team matches as well as domestic fixtures including the 2009 State Championship final.

The ground has most often been used to host Women's One Day International cricket. It staged the final and both semi-finals of the 2000 Women's World Cup, was the major venue at the World Series of Women's Cricket in 2003 and regularly hosts New Zealand women's team matches against touring sides.

The ground hosted its first One Day International between Netherlands and Kenya during the 2014 Cricket World Cup Qualifier on 23 January 2014.

International centuries

One Day International centuries
Only two ODIs have been played at the venue and three centuries have been achieved.

Women's One Day International centuries
14 WODI centuries have been scored at the Bert Sutcliffe Oval.

List of Five Wicket Hauls

One Day Internationals

References

External links
Cricinfo Profile
CricketArchive Profile

1998 establishments in New Zealand
Cricket grounds in New Zealand
Sports venues in Canterbury, New Zealand